Der Tog was a Yiddish-language daily newspaper published in New York City from 1914 until 1971. The offices of Der Tog were located on the Lower East Side, at 185 and 187 East Broadway.

History 
The newspaper's first issue was on November 5, 1914. At its peak Der Tog reached a circulation of 81,000, in 1916. It had a weekly English-language supplement entitled The Day, edited by Marion Weinstein. 
In 1919 Der Tog absorbed another Yiddish newspaper, Di Varhayt (Warheit; Wahrheit; "The Truth"), and between 1919 and 1922 was known as Der Tog, di Varhayt.

In 1953 Der Tog merged with the Morgn Zshurnal (Morning Journal), and subsequently appeared under the title Der Tog Morgn Zshurnal; the circulation was estimated at 50,000 in 1970, and the paper ceased publication in 1971.

It was followed by Der Algemeiner Journal in 1972.

Journalists and Writers 
The founding of the newspaper was the project of a group of businessmen and intellectuals including Judah Leib Magnes, David Shapiro, Morris Weinberg, and Herman Bernstein. Bernstein became the paper's first editor and Shapiro assumed the role of publisher. 
Styled in its masthead as a "newspaper for the Jewish intelligentsia," Der Tog sought to uphold high journalistic and literary standards, and to rise above ideological divides.

Under William Edlin, who succeeded Bernstein as editor in 1916, and the first literary editor, Benzion Hoffman (Zivion), the newspaper attracted a talented staff, including Shmuel Niger, who was its literary critic for many years, as well his brother the poet, author, and journalist Daniel Charney, who was a member of the editorial staff starting in 1925.

Among the other outstanding staff writers were David Pinski, Aron Glanz (A. Leyeles), Joel Slonim, Peretz Hirshbein, and Abraham Coralnik. Other significant contributors included Chaim Zhitlowsky, Jeremiah Hescheles and Samuel Rosenfeld, as well as H. Leivick, Osip Dymov, and Reuben Iceland. Leon Kobrin was the paper's chief fiction writer for nearly two decades; and among the more famous of other occasional literary contributors were Joseph Opatoshu and Abraham Reisen. The newspaper also published the entirety of the Bible translation by the poet Yehoash (pseudonym of Solomon Bloomgarden), and some works of Sholem Aleichem.

Edlin, who had been associated with the paper from its beginnings as a news editor and a theater critic, remained editor in chief until 1925. Samuel Margoshes filled that role from 1926 until 1942. At that point Edlin came back and led the paper again, until his death, in 1947. Solomon Dingol became editor-in-chief following Edlin's death, and was still editor when Der Tog merged with the Morning Journal in 1953.

According to Edlin, Der Tog was the first Yiddish newspaper to include female journalists on the editorial staff. Adella Kean Zametkin wrote about women's issues, and Dr. Ida Badanes, about health matters; the popular fiction writer Sarah B. Smith was also a regular contributor over many years. Before making her mark as a poet, Anna Margolin  (pseudonym of Rosa Lebensboym) distinguished herself as a reporter and editor for Der Tog, contributing a column, "In der froyen velt" (In the women's world), under her actual name, and articles about women's issues under various pseudonyms, including Clara Levin.

References

External links
Der Tog in the Historical Jewish Press
Guide to the Records of the Day-Morning Journal ("Der Tog"), 1922-1972, YIVO Institute for Jewish Research, RG 639.
Guide to the Papers of Herman Morgenstern, 1914-1976, YIVO Institute for Jewish Research, RG 1334. Morgenstern was a reporter and editor for Der Tog - Morgn Zshurnal from 1938 to 1971.

Yiddish newspapers
Defunct newspapers published in New York City
Defunct Yiddish-language newspapers published in the United States
Yiddish culture in New York City
Daily newspapers published in New York City